Video Retrospective is the first video album by American rock singer-songwriter Lenny Kravitz, released on November 25, 1991, in VHS format by Virgin Records America due to the success of his second album Mama Said. The album contains all of Kravitz's first music videos filmed from 1989 to 1991 from his first two albums, Let Love Rule and Mama Said.

Video content
"Let Love Rule"
"Mr. Cab Driver"
"I Build This Garden For Us"
"Be"
"Always on the Run" (feat. Slash)
"It Ain't Over 'Til It's Over"
"Stand by My Woman"
"Stop Draggin' Around"
"More Than Anything in this World" (Live)

External links
 Lenny Kravitz official site

1991 video albums
Lenny Kravitz video albums
Music video compilation albums
1991 compilation albums
Virgin Records video albums
Virgin Records compilation  albums